The Peña Dahu, named for the legendary French mountain animal, is a French amateur-built aircraft that was designed by Louis Peña of Dax, Landes and made available in the form of plans for amateur construction.

Design and development
The Dahu is intended for mountain flying, aero-towing gliders and touring. It features a cantilever low-wing, a four-seat enclosed cockpit, fixed conventional landing gear and a single engine in tractor configuration.

The Dahu is made from wood.

Reviewers Roy Beisswenger and Marino Boric described the design in a 2015 review as "unashamedly rustic".

Specifications (Dahu)

References

External links

Homebuilt aircraft
Single-engined tractor aircraft
Aerobatic aircraft